Joseph Hodkinson (3 May 1889 – 18 June 1954) was an English international footballer who played as an outside left.

Career
Born in Lancaster, Hodkinson played professionally for Glossop and Blackburn Rovers, and earned three caps for England between 1913 and 1919. He also represented the Football League twice.

References

1889 births
1954 deaths
Sportspeople from Lancaster, Lancashire
English footballers
England international footballers
Lancaster City F.C. players
Glossop North End A.F.C. players
Blackburn Rovers F.C. players
English Football League players
English Football League representative players
Association football outside forwards